A-One Hip-Hop Music Channel was a Russian music television channel broadcasting hip hop music.

The channel was broadcast on the satellite ABS-2 (FTA), on the "Tricolor TV" platform, and in 850 cable packages.

History 
After briefly being known as Alternative One before launch, A-One launched on 1 August 2005. In 2011,  took over and changed the channel's format to hip-hop music. Tolmatsky departed in 2013; the channel won several national awards during this time and launched a national party series, "A-One Hype Nights", featuring popular Russian and foreign artists.

External links
 A-One TV official site

Music television channels
Defunct television channels in Russia
Television production companies of Russia
Russian music awards
Television channels and stations established in 2005
Television channels and stations disestablished in 2016
2005 establishments in Russia
2016 disestablishments in Russia
Music organizations based in Russia